Beningbrough railway station was on the East Coast Main Line that served the village of Beningbrough, North Yorkshire, England from 1841 to 1965.

History 
The station was opened as Shipton on 31 March 1841 by the Great North of England Railway. The station's name was changed to Beningbrough on 1 December 1898. It was closed to passengers on 15 September 1958 and closed to goods traffic in 1965. A fragment of the southbound platform remains.

References 

Disused railway stations in North Yorkshire
Former North Eastern Railway (UK) stations
Railway stations in Great Britain opened in 1841
Railway stations in Great Britain closed in 1958
1841 establishments in England
1965 disestablishments in England